The 2012 North American Ski Mountaineering Championship was the first edition of a North American Championship of Ski Mountaineering.

The 2012 Crested Butte Ski Mountaineering Race, supported by the United States Ski Mountaineering Association (USSMA), held in Colorado from 27 to 29 January 2012 was billed as the North American Championship of the International Ski Mountaineering Federation (ISMF). Participants were competition ski mountaineers from Canada and the United States. Some competitors from other continents (italic in the ranking lists below) also participated in the Crested Butte Ski Mountaineering Race events, but appear only in the World ranking and not in the North American Championship's ranking (abbreviated NAC in the lists below).

Results

Sprint race 
Event held on January 28, 2012

List of the best 10 participants by gender:

Single race 
Event held on January 29, 2012

List of the best 10 participants by gender:

Total Ranking 
(total time of the sprint and the single races)

List of the best 10 teams by gender:

External links 
 US Ski Mountaineering National Championships, YouTube
 Climbing the clouds Virtual exhibit of British Columbia mountaineering

References 

2012
North American Ski Mountaineering Championship
Skiing in Colorado
North American Ski Mountaineering Championship
Gunnison County, Colorado
Skiing competitions in the United States
North American Ski Mountaineering Championship